The Long Search was a 1977 BBC documentary television series spanning 13 episodes. Presented by theatre director Ronald Eyre, the series surveyed several major world religions, including Protestant, Orthodox, and Catholic Christianity. Other episodes surveyed Theravada and Zen Buddhism, Islam, Judaism, Hinduism, and the New Age movement. Location filming took place in India, England, Italy, Japan, Israel, Romania, Sri Lanka, Taiwan, the United States, Egypt, Indonesia, and South Africa.

Scholar of religion Ninian Smart acted as editorial consultant to the show, and also authored a companion book by the same name. The series was re-issued on DVD, and is currently distributed by Ambrose Video.

Episode listing

Protestant Spirit USA (Indiana)
Hinduism: 330 Million gods
Buddhism: Footprint of the Buddha (Sri Lanka)
Catholicism: Rome, Leeds and the Desert
Islam: There is no God but God (Egypt)
Orthodox Christianity: The Romanian Solution
Judaism: The Chosen People
Religion In Indonesia: The Way of the Ancestors (Toraja)
Buddhism: The Land of the Disappearing Buddha (Japan)
African Religions: Zulu Zion (South Africa)
Taoism: A Question of Balance (Taiwan)
Alternative Lifestyles in California: West Meets East
Reflections on the Long Search

External links
 Archive.org collection
 Ambrose Video
 Amazon.com customer reviews of the BBC television series
 Link to Ninian Smart's companion book for the BBC television series
 Survey of series as published in 6(1) Religious Studies Review 17 (Jan. 1980)

Religion in the United Kingdom
Religion in popular culture
BBC television documentaries
Religious studies
1977 British television series debuts
1977 British television series endings
1970s British documentary television series
1970s British television miniseries
English-language television shows